John Keith Kelly Lockley (born 1971) is a white South African who is initiated as an igqirha, a traditional healer or sangoma of the Xhosa people.

Training as a sangoma
Lockley was born in Cape Town in 1971 during apartheid to an Irish mother and a Zimbabwean father with British ancestry.

He completed an honours degree in clinical psychology at Rhodes University in 1997.

In 1997 in post-apartheid South Africa he met Xhosa sangoma Mum Gwevu in the Joza township in Grahamstown, Eastern Cape. Mum Gwevu says she had foreseen his arrival in a dream. He was trained as a sangoma in the Eastern Cape townships, serving a 10-year apprenticeship with Mum Gwevu which he completed in 2007. Mum Gwevu gave him the Xhosa name Ucingolwendaba, which means "messenger".

He also practices and teaches yoga and Zen Buddhism.

References

Further reading 
 Baker, JH (June 2010) "The Lone Leopard" (PDF). Sacred Fire Magazine. Retrieved 10 March 2013
 Timm, Lindy (14 July 2009). "After the calling dream" (PDF). The South African. Retrieved 10 March 2013.    
 Zanardi, Sylvia (26 June 2015). "Sangomas - Traditional African Healers". Cape Chameleon. Retrieved 8 September 2016
 Ancer, Jonathan (20 March 2007) "A Call to Become a Sangoma". Grocott's. Archived (PDF) on 8 September 2016
 (10 August 2016) "Together We Are Strong" (PDF). Sacred Hoop Magazine, UK. Archived (PDF) on 8 September 2016

External links
 Interview on The Morning Show, TV3, Ireland (23 August 2011)
 Interview on Outlook, BBC World Service (13 May 2010)
 Interview on Saturday Live, BBC Radio 4 (5 Sept 2009)

Living people
1971 births
People from Cape Town
Rhodes University alumni
White South African people
South African people of Irish descent
South African people of British descent
South African animists
African shamanism